Central Valley is a town in Sevier County, Utah, United States. The population was 528 at the 2010 census. Known for years simply as Central, the town was named Central Valley at its incorporation in 2005.

Demographics
As of the census of 2010, there were 528 people living in the town. There were 194 housing units. The racial makeup was 98.3% White, 0.4% Black or African American, 0.2% American Indian and Alaska Native, 0.2% from some other race, and 0.9% from two or more races. Hispanic or Latino of any race were 2.1% of the population.

See also

 List of cities and towns in Utah

References

External links

Towns in Sevier County, Utah
Towns in Utah